The American School of Tegucigalpa (or AST) is a private, coeducational international school located in the neighbourhood of Lomas del Guijarro, in Tegucigalpa, Honduras.

AST is accredited by the Honduran Ministry of Education, the Southern Association of Colleges and Schools, and the International Baccalaureate Organization.  The Honduran Ministry of Education grants the national degree of Bachillerato to students who comply with additional credits and earn 160 hours of community service.

History 
Circa 1946 many American-based companies established themselves in Honduras. The American Embassy saw the need for a bilingual school for the children of the families moving to this country to work in said companies. Mr. James Webb, the American Embassy Cultural Attaché, served as a liaison between these American families and a group of Honduran visionaries who were willing to invest in this project. This is how the first bilingual school, The American School of Tegucigalpa, came to be, located in Barrio La Ronda in downtown Tegucigalpa. The initial school had 42 students and three classrooms.

Sports
The American School of Tegucigalpa participates in both the AASCA (Association of American Schools of Central America) and ABSH (Association of Bilingual Schools of Honduras) tournaments. 

AST's campus includes four FIBA approved basketball courts, four professional volleyball courts and one 90m x 68m artificial turf soccer field. These facilities allow the school to host the AASCA and ABSH tournaments consistently.

Notable alumni
Rafael Leonardo Callejas (former President of Honduras)
Carlos Roberto Flores (former President of Honduras)
Ricardo Maduro (former President of Honduras)
Francisco Herrera (rector of National Autonomous University of Honduras)
Natalia Lazarus (Actress, Writer, Entrepreneur)

References

External links

School website
 Alumni website
Honduras country Study

International schools in Honduras
American international schools in North America
Bilingual schools
Schools in Tegucigalpa
Educational institutions established in 1946
1946 establishments in Honduras